This is a list of every Georgia Bulldogs football team quarterback and the years they participated on the Georgia Bulldogs football team.

Main starting quarterbacks

1892 to 1894
The following players were the predominant quarters for the Bulldogs each season the team was a non-conference independent team, following the birth of Georgia football.

1895 to 1921 

The following quarterbacks were the predominant quarters for the Bulldogs each season after the establishment of the Southern Intercollegiate Athletic Association until the establishment of the Southern Conference.

1922 to 1932
The following quarterbacks were the predominant quarters for the Bulldogs each season after the establishment of the Southern Conference until the establishment of the Southeastern Conference.

1933 to present

The following quarterbacks were the leading passer for the Bulldogs each season since joining the Southeastern Conference in 1933.

References

Georgia Bulldogs

Georgia Bulldogs quarterbacks